The 1930 Iowa State Cyclones football team represented Iowa State College of Agricultural and Mechanic Arts (later renamed Iowa State University) in the Big Six Conference during the 1930 college football season. In their fifth and final season under head coach C. Noel Workman, the Cyclones compiled a 0–9 record (0–5 against conference opponents), finished in last place in the conference, and were outscored by opponents by a combined total of 134 to 64. They played their home games at State Field in Ames, Iowa.

Maynard Spear was the team captain. No Iowa State player was selected as a first-team all-conference player.

Schedule

References

Iowa State
Iowa State Cyclones football seasons
Iowa State Cyclones football